Nordlander is a Swedish family originating from the village of Norrland, Bjärtrå in Ångermanland, Sweden. Daniel Persson (1683–1763) relocated to the Norrland estate from his former residence at the crown land of Bjärtrå, a power house in Ångermanland until the establishment of Härnösand in 1585. Subsequently, his sons Erik Nordlander (1723–1782) and Nils Nordlander (1726–1775) assumed the family name in accordance with that of the estate and its village.

Members in selection
 Daniel Persson (1683–1763), holder of the crown land of Bjärtrå, and later Norrland estate
 Daniel Nordlander (1763–1842), Sea Captain, distinguished for valor in the Russo–Swedish Wars
 Nils Nordlander (1796–1874), prelate, Member of Parliament of the Riksdag of Sweden and founder of Skellefteå
 Daniel Nordlander (1829–1890), Lieutenant Colonel of the Swedish Army, Adjutant to King Charles XV of Sweden and Member of Parliament of the Riksdag of Sweden
 Nils Johan Nordlander (1834–1866), deputy Hundred Governor
 Anna Nordlander (1843–1877), artist
 Daniel Nordlander (1803–1836), Municipal commissioner
 John Nordlander (1894–), Sea Captain and humanitarian of the World War II
 Nils Brage Nordlander (1919-2009), physician and medical researcher, President of the County council of Uppsala
 Brita Nordlander (1921-2009), teacher and President of the Municipal council of Uppsalad

See also 
 Norrland (village)

References 

Swedish families
Political families
Skellefteå